The 1993 U.S. Open was the 93rd U.S. Open, held June 17–20 at Baltusrol Golf Club in Springfield, New Jersey, west of New York City. Lee Janzen shot all four rounds in the 60s and tied the U.S. Open scoring record to win the first of his two U.S. Open titles, two strokes ahead of  runner-up Payne Stewart.

Janzen's total of 272 tied the U.S. Open scoring record set by Jack Nicklaus in 1980, also at Baltusrol. It was the third consecutive time at Baltusrol that the scoring record was tied or broken. Nicklaus also won in 1967 with a 275, one stroke better than Ben Hogan's 276 at Riviera in 1948. Janzen joined Lee Trevino as the only champion to post all four rounds under 70; Trevino shot 275 in 1968, a quarter century earlier. (Rory McIlroy became the third in 2011 and set the scoring record.)

Past champions in the field

Made the cut

Missed the cut 

Source:

Course layout

Lower Course

Source:

Lengths of the course for previous major championships:

, par 70 - 1980 U.S. Open
, par 70 - 1967 U.S. Open
, par 70 - 1954 U.S. Open

, par 72 - 1936 U.S. Open (Upper Course)
, par 74 - 1915 U.S. Open (Old Course)
, par      - 1903 U.S. Open (Old Course)The Old Course was plowed under in 1918

Round summaries

First round
Thursday, June 17, 1993

Second round
Friday, June 18, 1993

Amateurs: Leonard (E), Berganio (+10), Oh (+15).

Third round
Saturday, June 19, 1993

Final round
Sunday, June 20, 1993

Janzen began the final round with a one-shot lead over Stewart. He kept the lead at the turn, but at the 10th his drive settled in thick rough and behind trees. Somehow Janzen's approach went through the branches and found the green, where he made par. He eventually lost sole possession of the lead, however, after three-putting at the 12th. A birdie at 14 put Janzen back on top, and after finding trouble at 16, his  chip found the hole for another birdie. After Stewart missed a lengthy putt for birdie, Janzen held a two-shot lead with just three to play. At the 17th hole, Janzen's drive hit a tree and deflected back into the fairway. Both players made par, and at the last Janzen hit a 4-iron approach to set up another birdie and seal the victory.

Amateur: Justin Leonard (+8)

Scorecard
Final round

Cumulative tournament scores, relative to par

Source:

References

External links
USOpen.com – 1993

U.S. Open (golf)
Golf in New Jersey
U.S. Open
U.S. Open (golf)
U.S. Open (golf)
U.S. Open (golf)